Agaronia hilli is a species of sea snail, a marine gastropod mollusk in the family Olividae, the olives.

Description
Original description: "Shell average size for genus, inflated, bulliform, with small, acuminate spire; aperture very wide and flaring; body whorl smooth, with silky texture; spire whorls almost completely covered by thick enamel deposit; anterior one-fourth of shell with thick, shiny, enamel deposit, sharply separated from silky-textured body whorl; columella thin, with several narrow, twisted plications; shell color olive-gray with speckles and small zig-zag of darker gray; spire enamel dark brownish-black; columella at posterior of aperture marked  with large, blackish-brown patch; anterior enamel deposit dark brown on dorsum, fading to tan near columella; interior of aperture white, bordered with brown along inner edge of lip; columella pale tan and white; early whorls white."

Distribution
Locus typicus: "Off Roatan Island, Honduras."

References

Olividae
Gastropods described in 1987